Pleasant Valley Colony is a census-designated place (CDP) and Hutterite colony in Moody County, South Dakota, United States. The population was 6 at the 2020 census. It was first listed as a CDP prior to the 2020 census.

Demographics

References 

Census-designated places in Moody County, South Dakota
Census-designated places in South Dakota
Hutterite communities in the United States